The Kaleidoscope World Tour was a Tiësto tour in support of his album Kaleidoscope. The tour will include 150 dates, spanning 5 continents.
 
On October 31, 2009, for his Halloween show at Congress Theater in Chicago, Tiesto dressed as the hometown Chicago Bears NFL quarterback Jay Cutler for his entire four-and-a-half-hour set.

Tour dates

See also
 Kaleidoscope

References

External links
 Tiësto tour information and ticketing (North America)

Tiësto concert tours
2009 concert tours
2010 concert tours